Prince County was a federal electoral district in Prince Edward Island, Canada, that was represented in the House of Commons of Canada from 1873 to 1896.

This riding was created in 1873 when Prince Edward island joined the Canadian Confederation.

It was abolished in 1896 when it was redistributed into  East Prince and West Prince ridings.

It consisted of Prince County, and elected two members.

Election results

See also 

 List of Canadian federal electoral districts
 Past Canadian electoral districts

External links 
Riding history for Prince County (1873–1892) from the Library of Parliament

Former federal electoral districts of Prince Edward Island
1873 establishments in Prince Edward Island
Constituencies established in 1873
1892 disestablishments in Prince Edward Island
Constituencies disestablished in 1892